Gražvydas Mikulėnas (born 16 December 1973 in Vilnius) is a retired Lithuanian footballer. Mikulėnas was a striker and former national team player of Lithuania.

International career
Mikulėnas made 12 appearances for the Lithuania national football team between 1997 and 2003. His debut in the Lithuania national football team took place in the match against Poland in Olsztyn on 24 September 1997 (a 0–2 loss).

References

External links

 
 

1973 births
Living people
Footballers from Vilnius
Lithuanian footballers
Lithuania international footballers
Lithuanian expatriate footballers
FK Žalgiris players
Polonia Warsaw players
GKS Katowice players
Wisła Płock players
Ruch Chorzów players
Zawisza Bydgoszcz players
Ekstraklasa players
GNK Dinamo Zagreb players
Croatian Football League players
Wigry Suwałki players
Expatriate footballers in Croatia
Lithuanian expatriate sportspeople in Poland
Expatriate footballers in Poland
FK Ventspils players
Expatriate footballers in Latvia
A.P.O. Akratitos Ano Liosia players
Expatriate footballers in Greece
Association football forwards